Thomas Joseph Katz is an American organic chemist known for his experimental work with prismane, olefin metathesis, and enyne metathesis. He is an emeritus professor at Columbia University.

Training 
Katz earned a bachelor's degree in chemistry at the University of Wisconsin–Madison in 1956 and received his doctoral thesis in chemistry at Harvard in 1959.

Academic career 
Katz was an instructor at  Columbia University from 1959 until 1961, following by an assistant professorship from 1961to 1964. He became an associate professor in 1964, and then a full professor in 1968. In 1965, he was a visiting associate professor at University of California Berkeley. In 2009, he retired, becoming professor emeritus.

References

Living people
University of Wisconsin–Madison College of Letters and Science alumni
Harvard University alumni
Organic chemists
21st-century American chemists
Year of birth missing (living people)
Columbia University faculty